The Bangladesh National Film Award for Best Cinematography is one of the highest film awards in Bangladesh. Since 1975, the awards are given in the category of best screenplay.

List of winners

Records and statistics

Multiple wins and nominations
The following individuals received two or more Best Cinematographer awards:

References

Cinematographer
National Film Awards (Bangladesh)